Potanipo Pond (also known Potanipo Lake or Lake Potanipo) is a   water body located in Hillsborough County in southern New Hampshire, United States, in the town of Brookline. Potanipo Pond is the source of the Nissitissit River, which flows via the Nashua River into the Merrimack River, and then to the Gulf of Maine.

The lake is classified as a warmwater fishery, with observed species including largemouth bass, chain pickerel, yellow perch, pumpkinseed, and horned pout.

See also

List of lakes in New Hampshire
New Hampshire Historical Marker No. 271: Fresh Pond Ice Company
Potanipo Hill

References

Lakes of Hillsborough County, New Hampshire
Brookline, New Hampshire